The Secwepemc Museum and Heritage Park is located in Kamloops, British Columbia. The inside of the museum has four different galleries showcasing the cultural and traditional lives of the Secwepemc People. The Heritage Park consists of a beautiful trail along the South Thompson River which allows visitors to explore a 2000-year-old pithouse and an ethnobotanical garden which is filled with traditional Secwepemc plants.

Affiliations
The Museum is affiliated with: CMA,  CHIN, and Virtual Museum of Canada.

References

External links
Secwepemc Museum and Heritage Park

Secwepemc
Buildings and structures in Kamloops
First Nations culture
Museums in British Columbia
Archaeological sites in British Columbia
Archaeological museums in Canada
First Nations museums in Canada